Murtaza Raza Choudhry was a Member of the 1st National Assembly of Pakistan as a representative of East Pakistan.

Early life and family
Choudhry was born into an aristocratic Bengali Muslim family known as the Zamindars of Monakosha in Nawabganj, Malda district (now in present-day Bangladesh). His father, Jehad Ahmad Choudhry, was the zamindar of Monakosha. His paternal grandfather, Ismail Hossain Choudhry, was the zamindar of Kotalpukur in Bihar. 

Choudhry married Syeda Roqeya Akhtar, the daughter of Syed Azizullah and Syeda Ammatul Ela Raziya Khatun. They had ten children. His eldest son, Mainur Reza Chowdhury, became the 12th Chief Justice of Bangladesh and served as an adviser at the caretaker government of Bangladesh. Choudhry's sister-in-law, Syeda Selena Akhtar, was the wife of Fazlul Qadir Chaudhry.

Career
Choudhry was a Member of the Constituent Assembly of Pakistan. He served as the State Minister of Finance.

References

Pakistani MNAs 1947–1954
20th-century Bengalis
Year of birth missing
People from Chapai Nawabganj district
Bangladeshi people of Bihari descent
Members of the Constituent Assembly of Pakistan